Fridrik Thordarson (1928 – 2 October 2005) was an Icelandic linguist. Thordarson was born in Iceland, and studied Classical philology in Oslo. In 1963 he took exams with Latin as his major and Greek and Indian philology as his minors. From 1965 onwards he taught classical philology as a lecturer and he became professor in 1994. He worked for most of his life in Norway.

Apart from Classical languages, he became an expert in Caucasian languages such as Georgian and Ossetic. He published a grammar of Ossetic. Thordarson was a regular contributor and a consulting editor to Encyclopaedia Iranica.

Sources 

University of Frankfurt

Bibliography 

 Ossetic Grammatical Studies. Wien: Verlag der österreichischen Akademie der Wissenschaften, 2009. 
 An article on Ossetic grammar by Fridrik Thordarson

1928 births
2005 deaths
Icelandic academics
Academic staff of the University of Oslo
Icelandic expatriates in Norway